The Dingoo is a handheld gaming console that supports music and video playback and open game development. The system features an on-board radio and recording program. It was sold to consumers in three colors: white, black, and pink. It was released in February 2009 and has since sold over 1 million units. 

Other versions of the console include Dingoo A330 and Dingoo A380.

Dingoo focuses on games and media products, and is located in the Futian District, Shenzhen.

Hardware

Specifications

A320
 Internal Storage 1/2/4GB flash
 Additional Storage MiniSD/SDHC (MicroSD/SDHC with adapter)
 Input D-Pad, 2 shoulder, 4 face, Start & Select buttons, Microphone.
 Outputs Stereo Speakers, Headphone Jack & TV-out w/ included cable
 I/O Mini-USB connector 2.0
 Video Playback RM, MP4, 3GP, AVI, ASF, MOV, FLV, MPEG
 Audio Playback MP3, WMA, APE, FLAC, RA
 Radio Digital FM Tuner
 Recording Supports digital recording of voice (MP3 and WMA formats) and FM radio at 8 kHz
 Software Support Free official SDKs Available
 Dimensions 
 Weight 
 Display 320×240

The Dingoo A320 uses a rechargeable Lithium-Ion battery with 6 to 8 hours of battery life. The battery specs are 3.7V 1700-1800 mAh (6.29WH).

Function

Games

Original 
Original games in two different languages (USA (U) and Chinese (C)) for the Native OS are included:

 7 Days - Salvation (U)
 Ali Baba (U)
 Amiba's Candy (U)
 Block Breaker (U)
 Decollation Warrior [God of War Criminal Day] (U)
 Dingoo Link Em Up (U)
 Dingoo Snake (U)
 Hell Striker II [World Road] (U)
 Landlord (U)
 Nose Breaker (U)
 Puzzle Bobble [PoPo Bash] (C)
 Tetris (U)
 Ultimate Drift (U)
 Yi-Chi King Fighter (C)
 Zhao Yun Chuan (C)

Homebrew 
Homebrew / Public Domain (PD) games for all operation systems (OS) can be added manually:

Native OS 

 15
 Aothello
 Arcade Volleyball
 Astro Lander
 Biniax 2
 BlueCube4D
 Brickomania
 Cave Story
 Chip World
 Color Lines
 Commander Koon [Commander Keen]
 Connect Four - Zero Gravity
 Digger
 Dooom
 Game & Watch - Formula 1
 HexaVirus
 Manic Miner
 MineSweeper
 mRPG
 Mushroom Roulette
 New RAW [Another World]
 Quake
 Rubido
 SameGoo
 SomeTris
 Spartak-Chess
 Spear of Destiny
 Spoout
 szSokuban760
 szSudoku760 [Sudoku Platinum]
 TCGS Car
 The Last Mission
 TowerToppler [Nebulus]
 Vectoroids
 Vorton
 Wolfenstein 3-D
 Wubtris
 XRickOO [Rick Dangerous]

Dingux 

 Duke Nukem 3D

Emulation

Official 
 GBA
 NES
 Neo Geo
 SNES
 CPS-1
 CPS-2
 Sega Mega Drive/Genesis

Community-based 

 Amiga
 Atari 2600
 Atari 5200
 Atari 7800
 Atari 8-bit family
 Atari Lynx
 ColecoVision
 Commodore 64
 Game Boy and Game Boy Color
 Game Boy Advance
 Genesis / Mega Drive and Mega-CD (Dingux only)
 Magnavox Odyssey 2
 MSX (openMSX Dingux)
 Neo Geo
 Neo Geo Pocket
 PC Engine
 PlayStation (Dingux only)
 Master System, SG-1000 and Game Gear (in progress, working for most games)
 WonderSwan and WonderSwan Color (in progress, working for most games)
 ZX Spectrum (GP2Xpectrum for Dingux, Unreal Speccy Portable for native OS)

Arcade games 
 Centipede and Millipede
 CPS-1
 CPS-2
 FinalBurn Alpha (Dingux only)
 MAME 
 Mikie (Konami arcade game)
 Pac-Man and Ms. Pac-Man

Video player 
 Video containers: RMVB, RM, AVI, WMV, FLV, MPEG, MP4, ASF, MOV
 Video codecs: WMV1, WMV3, WMV7, WMV8.1, WMV9, MP42, mp4v, DIV3, DiVX5, XViD, MJPG, MPEG1, MPEG2

Audio player 
 Audio formats: MP3, WMA, APE, FLAC, WAV, AC3, MOD, S3M, XM
 Channels: Stereo
 EQ Function

Photo viewer 
 Supports JPG, BMP, GIF, PNG File Formats

Text reader 
 Supports TXT file formats (English and Chinese)
 Supports English text to speech
 Further functions include bookmarking, auto browsing, font sizing, and it can open while music is playing.

Radio receiver 
 FM Radio
 Wide frequency range from 76.0 to 108.0 MHz, support manual/auto channel scanning, FM recording and can keep playing while using other application. User can save up to 40 channels.

Audio recording 
 Voice and radio recording
 Voice recording and supports MP3/WAV formats.

Other 
 Supports SWF File Format (only Flash 6)
 SD Card virus protection: The system protects itself from viruses by scanning the SD Card. 
 USB 2.0 Port: Supports Windows 2000/XP/Vista as well as Mac OS X

File browser 
 Allows you to browse the files on your Dingoo, such as games, music, videos, photos, and voice recordings

Firmware

Official firmware 
Firmware V1.01
Firmware V1.02
Firmware V1.03
Firmware V1.10 (Added Multi-Language Support)
Firmware V1.11 (Added Korean Language Support)
Firmware V1.20 (Y & B button bug fix and more)
Firmware V1.22

Unofficial firmware 
Team Dingoo released the first unofficial firmware with user customizable theming possibilities. The system files were moved from hidden memory to an accessible memory location, allowing users to change the graphical settings. This firmware is updated regularly.

a320-1.03TD-3
a320-1.03TD-2
a320-1.03TD-1

µC/OS-II 
The native operating system of the Dingoo A320 is a variant of µC/uOS-II, a low-cost priority-based pre-emptive real time multitasking operating system kernel for microprocessors, written mainly in the C programming language. It is mainly intended for use in embedded systems. All official software for the Dingoo A-320 (including its emulators) run on µC/OS-II.

Linux 
A Linux kernel was generally released by Booboo on Google Code on May 18, 2009.

A dual boot installer called "Dingux" was released June 24. This allows for dual booting the original firmware or Linux without the need for connection to a PC.

Enthusiasts have successfully run Linux versions of many games, including Prboom engine (Doom, Hexen, Heretic), Build engine (Duke Nukem 3D, Shadow Warrior), Quake, Dodgin' Diamonds 1 & 2, Biniax 2, GNU Robbo, Super Transball 2, Defendguin, Waternet, Sdlroids, Spout, Tyrian, Rise of the Triad, Open Liero, REminiscence, Blockrage, and the OpenBOR game engine.

The Dingoo can run emulators: ScummVM, SMS Plus, Gmuplayer, FinalBurn Alpha, Gnuboy, GpSP, MAME, PSX4ALL, Snes9x, PicoDrive, openMSX, GP2Xpectrum, FCEUX and VICE.

See also
Comparison of handheld game consoles
 Similar portable Linux kernel-based gaming devices:
 GP32
 GP2X
 GP2X Wiz
 GP2X Caanoo
 Pandora (console)
 DragonBox Pyra
 GCW Zero
 Mi2 console
 List of Linux-based, handheld gaming devices
 Linux for gaming

Reviews 
 Dingoo A320 review by Tech Radar

External links 
 Dingoo Official Website (English)

References 

Seventh-generation video game consoles
Handheld game consoles
MIPS-based video game consoles